Cyperus laxiflorus is a species of sedge that is native to Madagascar and Mauritius.

See also 
 List of Cyperus species

References 

laxiflorus
Plants described in 1806
Flora of Madagascar
Flora of Mauritius
Taxa named by Jean Louis Marie Poiret